Sullivan, Papain, Block, McGrath, & Cannavo is an American law firm headquartered in New York City. It is noted for its work on 9/11 Litigation and Victim's Compensation.

History
Established over 75 years ago, Sullivan & Papain employs 39 lawyers in four offices, with its main office located in New York City.

Notable lawyers of the firm include former New York Congressman Herman Badillo.

Areas of practice
The firm in noted for its work on cases such as the 9/11 Litigation and Victim's Compensation Fund, World Trade Center funding, and the Vioxx cases. The firm was also one of six firms chosen to represent the State of New York in its litigation against the major tobacco companies. Practice areas include:
 Medical malpractice
 Negligence
 Mass torts
 Labor law

See also
Seong Sil Kim v. New York City Transit Authority

References

External links

Law firms based in New York City
Law firms with year of establishment missing